Mark O'Sullivan may refer to:
 Mark O'Sullivan (Gaelic footballer) (born 1973)
 Mark O'Sullivan (association footballer) (born 1983)